Harborne ward is a local government district, one of 40 wards that make up Birmingham City Council.  Harborne lies to the south west of Birmingham city centre. It has a slightly older age profile than
the city average. The percentage of ethnic minority residents is below the city average. Unemployment is below the city average. The ward population at the 2011 census was 23,001.

Politics
The Harborne ward is currently represented by two Labour and Co-operative Councillors; Jayne Francis (2016-) and Martin Brooks (2022-).

The ward of Harborne forms part of the  Parliamentary constituency of Birmingham Edgbaston along with Bartley Green, Edgbaston (ward), and Quinton, which has been represented by Labour and Co-operative MP Preet Gill since 2017.

Election results

2010s

2000s

1990

1980

1970s

References

Wards of Birmingham, West Midlands
Harborne